Tillandsia itaubensis is a species of plant in the genus Tillandsia. This species is native to Brazil.

References

itaubensis
Flora of Brazil